James Charles Barnes (born September 9, 1949 in Hobart, Oklahoma, U.S.) is an American composer.

Barnes studied composition and music theory at the University of Kansas, earning a Bachelor of Music in 1974, and Master of Music in 1975. He studied conducting privately with Zuohuang Chen. In 1977 he joined the faculty at the University of Kansas as professor of music theory and composition. He retired in August 2015, but retains his emeritus status at U. of K. 

Barnes is also a tubist and has performed with numerous professional organizations in the United States.

His numerous compositions are frequently played in America, Europe, Japan, Taiwan and Australia. The Japanese concert band Tokyo Kosei Wind Orchestra has produced 3 CDs to date with works of James Barnes.

He has twice received the American Bandmasters Association Ostwald Award for contemporary wind band music.

Works

Works for concert band 
 A Solemn Prelude for Symphonic Band, Op. 114
 A Light in the Wilderness
 A Very American Overture, Op. 93
 All Pleasant Things - commissioned by the Northshore Concert Band
 Alvamar Overture, Op. 45
 Appalachian Overture, Op. 51
 Arioso For Symphonic Band
Autumn Soliloquy for Oboe and Concert Band
 Beautiful Oregon
 Breckenridge
 Brookshire Suite
 Caribbean Hideaway
 Carnaval in São Paulo
 Centennial Celebration Overture
 Century Tower Overture
 Chorale and Jubiloso
 Chorale Prelude on a German Folk Tune, Op. 61
Citadel (2015)
Credo (2016)
 Concerto for Tuba and Wind Band
 Crossgate
 Dance Variants - commissioned by the Honolulu Wind Ensemble
 Danza Sinfonica
 Desperate Pursuit
Dexter Park Celebration (2017)
Dream Journey (a Tone Poem for Symphonic Band), Op. 98
 Dreamers...
 Doctor Who
 Duo Concertante, Op. 74
 Eagle Crest
 Eagle Bend Overture for Band
 Eisenhower Centennial March
Fanfare and Capriccio
Fanfares and Alleluias
Fantasy Variations on a Theme by Nicolo Paganini (1988)
 Festival Concert March
 Festive Music for Singapore
 Foxfire Overture for Symphonic Band, Op. 111
 German Folk Tune
 Golden Brass
 Golden Festival Overture, Op. 95
 Heatherwood Portrait
 High Plains Overture
 Hobart Centennial March
 Hunter Park
 Inspiration Point
 Inventions On Marching Songs
 Invocation and Toccata
 Impressions of Japan
 Jubilation Overture
 Legend
 Lonely Beach Normandy 1944 
 Long Gray Line
 Maracas from Caracas
 March Kawasaki
 Meadowlark, A Pastorale
 Medicine Lodge
 Mojaves Claves
 Music from "Girl Crazy" by George Gershwin
 Nulli Secundus March
 Omaggio
 Pagan Dances
 Ritual 
 Mystics 
 The Master of the Sword
 Poetic Intermezzo
 Rapscallion
 Rhapsodic Essay; Gathering of Eagles
 Riverfest
 Romanza
 Spitfire Overture
 Stone Meadows
 Sunflower Saga
 Symphonic Essay, Op. 133
 Symphonic Overture, Op. 80
 The Old Guard
 The Pershing Rifles
 The Silver Gazebo
 The Texans
 Toccata Fantastica
 Torch Dance
 Trailridge Saga
 Trail of Tears
 Tribute, Op. 134
 Trumpets and Drums
 Twin Oaks Overture for Band
 Valor
 Variations on a Moravian Hymn
 Visions Macabres
 Westport Overture
 Westridge Overture
 Wild Blue Yonder
 Wildwood Overture
 Yama Midori (Green Mountains)
 Yorkshire Ballad

Symphonies
 Second Symphony, Op. 44
 Elegia
 Variazioni Interrotte
 Finale
 Third Symphony - "The Tragic", Op. 89
 Lento. Allegro ritmico
 Scherzo
 Fantasia - Mesto (for Natalie)
 Finale - Allegro giocoso
 Fourth Symphony – "Yellowstone Portraits", Op. 103b
 Dawn on the Yellowstone River
 Pronghorn Scherzo
 Inspiration Point (Tower Falls)
 Fifth Symphony "Phoenix", Op. 110
 Eulogy
 Scherzo
 Reverie
 Jubilation
 Sixth Symphony, Op. 130 (written for the Lake Braddock High School Symphonic Band)
 Andante, ma non troppo
 Adagio
 Allegro energico
 Seventh Symphony – "Symphonic Requiem", Op. 135
 Prologue - The Hornet's Nest (Shiloh, April 1862)  
 Marye's Heights (Fredericksburg, December 1862)  
 Longstreet's Assault (The Third Day at Gettysburg, July 1863)  
 Apotheosis (Appomattox, 1865)
 Eighth Symphony – "for Wangen", Op. 148 (written for the 1200 anniversary of Wangen im Allgäu in 2015, premiere on March 20, 2015 in Wangen im Allgäu by Stadtkapelle Wangen conducted by James Barnes.)
 Ninth Symphony – "Elegy', Op. 160 (commissioned by a consortium of twenty-one college bands, including the University of North Texas Symphonic Band, community bands, professional bands and individuals to help mark the 70th birthday of the composer.)
 Elegy
 Scherzo
 Night Music
 Finale

References

External links
 James Barnes, School of Music, University of Kansas

1949 births
Living people
Concert band composers
People from Hobart, Oklahoma
University of Kansas alumni
American male composers
21st-century American composers
American tubists
University of Kansas faculty
Distinguished Service to Music Medal recipients
21st-century tubists
21st-century American male musicians